Benjamín Prado (born 13 July 1961) is a Spanish novelist, essayist and poet.

He was born in Madrid. He has received several prizes for his work, including the Premio Hiperión, the Premio Internacional Ciudad de Melilla, the Premio Internacional Generación del 27 and the Premio Andalucía de Novela. His work has been translated into numerous languages, including English.

Works
 1986 - Un caso sencillo - Poetry
 1991 - El corazón azul del alumbrado - Poetry
 1992 - Asuntos personales - Poetry
 1995 - Cobijo contra la tormenta - Poetry
 1995 - Raro - Novel
 1996 - Nunca le des la mano a un pistolero zurdo - Novel
 1996 - Dónde crees que vas y quién te crees que eres - Novel
 1998 - Todos nosotros - Poetry
 1998 - Alguien se acerca - Novel
 1999 - No sólo el fuego - Novel
 2000 - La nieve está vacía - Novel
 2000 - Siete maneras de decir manzana - Essays
 2001 - Los nombres de Antígona - Essays
 2002 - Ecuador (poesía 1986-2001) - Poetry (compilation)
 2002 - Iceberg - Poetry
 2002 - A la sombra del ángel (13 años con Alberti) - Memoirs	
 2003 - Jamás saldré vivo de este mundo - Stories
 2004 - Carmen Laforet - Biography, with Teresa Rosenvinge	
 2006 - Marea humana - Poetry
 2006 - Mala gente que camina - Novel
 2009 - Romper una canción - Biographical essay 
 2011 - Operación Gladio - Novel
 2012 - Pura lógica - Aphorisms
 2013 - Ajuste de cuentas - Novel
 2013 - Qué escondes en la mano - Stories
 2014 - Doble fondo - Aphorisms
 2014 - Ya no es tarde - Poetry
 2015 - Más que palabras - Aphorisms

Anthologies
 Mi antología Biblioteca de poesía española. Universidad de las Américas. Puebla, México, 2007.
 Aquí y entonces Embajada de España en Cuba. La Habana, Cuba, 2008.
 No me cuentes tu vida Editorial Mesa Redonda. Lima, Perú, 2011.29
 Si dejas de quererme lo sabrá este poema Ediciones La Fragua. San Salvador. El Salvador, 2012.30
 Yo sólo puedo estar contigo o contra mí Círculo de Poesía. México, 2012.31

Translations into English
 Not Only Fire (No sólo el fuego) translated by Sam Richard, Faber & Faber, 2002
 Snow is Silent (La nieve está vacía) translated by Sam Richard, Faber & Faber, 2005

References

1961 births
Living people
People from Madrid
20th-century Spanish novelists
21st-century Spanish novelists
Spanish male novelists
20th-century Spanish poets
20th-century Spanish male writers
Spanish essayists
Spanish male poets
Male essayists
20th-century essayists
21st-century essayists
21st-century Spanish male writers